Reflectopallium marmoratum, one of the leaf-veined slugs, is a species of air-breathing land slug, specifically a leaf-veined slug, a terrestrial gastropod mollusc in the family Athoracophoridae.

References
 Powell A. W. B., New Zealand Mollusca, William Collins Publishers Ltd, Auckland, New Zealand 1979 

Athoracophoridae
Gastropods of Australia
Gastropods of New Zealand
Gastropods described in 1889